Catch as Catch Can is a 1937 British crime film directed by Roy Kellino and starring James Mason, Viki Dobson, Eddie Pola and Margaret Rutherford. On board a luxury liner, young Barbara Standish attempts to smuggle stolen jewels from France to America.

Cast
Robert Leyland - 	James Mason
Barbara Standish - 	Vicky Dobson
Tony Canzari - 	Eddie Pola
Al Parsons - 	Finlay Currie
Eddie Fallon - 	John Warwick
Maggie Carberry - 	Margaret Rutherford
Cornwallis - 	Paul Blake
Ben - 	Jimmy Mageean
Fournival - 	Paul Sheridan
Mrs Kendall - 	Zoe Wynn

References

External links
Catch as Catch Can at Internet Movie Database

1937 films
1937 crime films
British crime films
British black-and-white films
Films directed by Roy Kellino
1930s English-language films
1930s British films